World Wrestling Association is a professional wrestling promotion based in Tijuana, Mexico.

World Wrestling Association may also refer to:

World Wrestling Association (Indianapolis), a professional wrestling promotion based in Indianapolis, Indiana
Worldwide Wrestling Associates, a professional wrestling promotion based in Los Angeles, California

See also  
WWA (disambiguation)